Pseudochauhanea is a genus of monogeneans within the family Chauhaneidae. There are currently 5 species assigned to the genus.

Species 

 Pseudochauhanea elegans 
 Pseudochauhanea elongata 
 Pseudochauhanea macrorchis 
 Pseudochauhanea mexicana 
 Pseudochauhanea sphyraenae

References 

Monogenea genera
Polyopisthocotylea